Ken Horton is a Scottish curler and curling coach.

Teams

Record as a coach of national teams

References

External links
 
 Ken Horton | english curling

Living people
Scottish male curlers
Scottish curling champions
Scottish curling coaches
Year of birth missing (living people)